The 2021 Knoxville Challenger was a professional tennis tournament played on indoor hard courts. It was the seventeenth edition of the tournament which was part of the 2021 ATP Challenger Tour. It took place in Knoxville, United States between 8 and 14 November 2021.

Singles main-draw entrants

Seeds

 1 Rankings are as of November 1, 2021.

Other entrants
The following players received wildcards into the singles main draw:
  Aleksandar Kovacevic
  Emilio Nava
  Adam Walton

The following player received entry into the singles main draw using a protected ranking:
  Tatsuma Ito

The following players received entry into the singles main draw as alternates:
  Christian Harrison
  Malek Jaziri
  Peter Polansky

The following players received entry from the qualifying draw:
  JC Aragone
  Gijs Brouwer
  Aidan McHugh
  Donald Young

Champions

Singles

 Christopher Eubanks def.  Daniel Altmaier 6–3, 6–4.

Doubles

  Malek Jaziri /  Blaž Rola def.  Hans Hach Verdugo /  Miguel Ángel Reyes-Varela 3–6, 6–3, [10–5].

References

2021 ATP Challenger Tour
2021
2021 in American tennis
November 2021 sports events in the United States
2021 in sports in Tennessee